The 2002 United States Senate election in North Carolina was held on November 5, 2002. Incumbent Republican U.S. Senator Jesse Helms decided to retire due to health issues. Republican Elizabeth Dole won the open seat. This was the 1st open seat election since 1974.

Democratic primary 
During the primary campaign, Bowles was considered the choice of the party establishment, receiving support from former Governor Jim Hunt and the AFL-CIO.

Candidates 
 Dan Blue, State Representative
 Erskine Bowles, former White House Chief of Staff
 Cynthia D. Brown, Durham City Councilwoman
 Elaine Marshall, Secretary of State of North Carolina

Results

Republican primary 
Dole was described as the "handpicked" choice of the White House, and received the support of President George W. Bush, Vice President Dick Cheney, as well as outgoing Senator Jesse Helms.

Candidates 
 Elizabeth Dole, former United States Secretary of Labor, former United States Secretary of Transportation, former Assistant to the President for Public Liaison, and wife of former U.S. Senator Bob Dole
 James Snyder Jr., former state representative
 Jim Parker, physician
 Ada Fisher, physician and activist

Results

General election

Candidates 
 Erskine Bowles (D), former White House Chief of Staff
 Elizabeth Dole (R), former United States Secretary of Labor, United States Secretary of Transportation, Assistant to the President for Public Liaison, and wife of U.S. Senator Bob Dole
Sean Haugh (L)

Debates
Complete video of debate, October 14, 2002
Complete video of debate, October 19, 2002

Predictions

Polling

Results

See also 
 2002 United States Senate elections

Notes

References 

United States Senate
North Carolina
2002